Outwood  may refer to:

Places in the United Kingdom
Outwood, Greater Manchester, formerly a civil parish
Outwood, Somerset, a UK location
Outwood, Surrey
Outwood, Wakefield
Outwood, Worcestershire, a neighbourhood in Chaddesley Corbett

See also
 Outwood Grange Academies Trust, including a list of schools